Gading Marine FIC / FAC is a combat boat made by Malaysian company Gading Marine. Its currently in service with Royal Malaysia Police (RMP) and also ordered by Royal Malaysian Navy (RMN) in 2020.

Development
After the intrusion in Lahad Datu, Sabah in 2013, Malaysia desperately needs a fast interceptor craft for its security forces to patrol the shallow waters and tight area in Sabah. The establishment of ESSCOM and  ESSZONE and ongoing Ops Benteng also makes the acquisition of this combat boat very important. This combat boat is currently in service with Royal Malaysia Police under the name of Gading Marine FAC PC 31. In October 2020, Royal Malaysian Navy has ordered G2000 FIC 18M version for its fast interceptor craft acquisition project.

Variants

FAC PC 31
This variant in service with Royal Malaysia Police. It has a length of 17.6 meters and a beam of 4.6 meters with 1.0 meters draught and can be equipped with 12.7 mm machine gun and 7.62 mm machine gun. Its powered by two 1200 horsepower engines and can reach to the maximum speed of 45 knots.

G2000 FIC 18M
Ordered by Royal Malaysian Navy in October 2020. It has a length of 18 meters and a beam of 4.6 meters with 1.2 meters draught. Armed with one 12.7 mm RCWS and two 7.62 mm machine guns. Its powered by two MAN 1550 horsepower main engines and two HamiltonJet HM461 water jets and can reach to the maximum speed of 50 knots. This FIC also equipped with multi-function display radar, navigation radar, AIS, FLIR, HF radio, VHF radio and intercom.

Operators
 
 Royal Malaysia Police
 Royal Malaysian Navy

References

Military boats
Military equipment of Malaysia